Wrap Up is a 2007 comedy film directed and written by Ramón Costafreda.

Cast
 Manuela Pal ...Valeria
 Félix Gómez ...Marcelo
 María Bouzas ...Adela
 Celso Bugallo ...Coco
 Amalia Gómez ...Leonor
 Pablo Tamayo ...Telmo
 Cristina Ramallal ...Montse
 María Salgueiro ...Irene
 Álex Neira ...Gabriel
 Isabel Naveira ...María

External links
 
 Abrígate at the cinenacional.com .

2007 films
2000s Spanish-language films
2007 comedy films
Spanish comedy films
Argentine comedy films
2000s Argentine films
2000s Spanish films